Badt is a German surname. Notable people with the surname include:

 Bertha Badt-Strauss (1885–1970), German writer and Zionist
 Kurt Badt (1890–1973), German art historian

See also
 BADT, Bank account debits tax

German-language surnames